Jean Schuth (born 7 December 1941), most commonly known as Johnny Schuth, is a French former football goalkeeper. He was part of France national football team at the FIFA World Cup 1966 but never played for his country.

References
Stats
Profile

1941 births
Living people
French people of German descent
French footballers
Association football goalkeepers
RC Strasbourg Alsace players
FC Metz players
1966 FIFA World Cup players
People from Saint-Omer
Footballers from Hauts-de-France